Bambi Kino is a band formed by four members of notable American indie rock groups, including Doug Gillard and Ira Elliot, to play music of the early 1960s for a celebration of the fiftieth anniversary of the first Beatles concerts in Hamburg, Germany. The group debuted in Hamburg in 2010 and continues to perform.

Musical career 

Bambi Kino was formed in New York in anticipation of 2010's fiftieth anniversary of the Beatles' first shows in Hamburg. The project was created to cover songs from the formative 1960–1962 pre-celebrity era of The Beatles in Hamburg and at the Cavern Club. "Mark and Ira toured through Hamburg in the band Maplewood the previous year and saw that there was nothing planned anywhere to celebrate the 50th anniversary of the Fabs’ life-changing first run in Germany," Gillard said in 2014. "So they brainstormed and came up with the Bambi Kino concept. Let’s play the covers they played in Hamburg, and in their style, nothing written past 1962."

The group's name was taken from the Bambi Kino, a movie theater in Hamburg, described as squalid, where the Beatles lived in cramped storerooms.

The founding members were guitarist Mark Rozzo (Maplewood and Champale), guitarist Doug Gillard (Guided by Voices), drummer Ira Elliot (Nada Surf), and bassist Erik Paparazzi (Cat Power). Gillard had previously been a member of Death of Samantha and Cobra Verde, among other notable bands. While performing in Bambi Kino, Gillard plays a 1967 Gibson ES-330 and a Höfner Verithin. Rozzo plays a 1960 Gibson ES-330.

On August 19, 2010, the band debuted with a series of shows at the Indra Club in Hamburg, where the Beatles first played.

In advance of these shows, a debut single — "Some Other Guy" — was released on Hamburg-based Tapete Records. It was produced by Adam Schlesinger (Fountains of Wayne) and engineered by Eli Janney (Girls Against Boys and The 8G Band).

In 2011, Tapete released the group's self-titled debut album. The record was praised by AllMusic's James Allen for its authentically "scrappy Merseybeat style," resulting in an album that "also happens to rock on its own merits." In an interview, Rozzo said, "We very consciously didn’t want to be a tribute band. We wanted to be ourselves, and in doing that we thought we were being truer to The Beatles."

The group remains active. In 2014, Bambi Kino played a benefit concert at Brooklyn's Bell House. as well as the White House Correspondents Jam, in Washington, DC, with Chuck Leavell, keyboardist for the Rolling Stones. They have played frequently in New York, appeared at festivals, and have made trips to the West Coast and Midwest of America, and back to Hamburg. Shows are typically three or four sets, emulating the style and duration of Beatles performances in Hamburg. They have frequently been joined by guest performers, including Wally Bryson (the Raspberries), Stuart Bogie (Iron and Wine), comedians Neil Hamburger and Dave Hill, producer Don Fleming, and Beatles historian Mark Lewisohn.

In September 2010, the European network Arte broadcast a Bambi Kino concert film/documentary, filmed at the Indra.

Discography 
 Bambi Kino (Tapete Records, 2011)
 "Some Other Guy" b/w "Falling In Love Again" (Tapete Records, 2011) — 7" single
 Superhits of the Seventies (WFMU compilation, 2012)

References

External links 
 
 

Cover bands
Rock music groups from New York (state)
Musical groups established in 2009
Tapete Records artists